Credicoop San Cristóbal is a Peruvian football club located in the city of Moquegua, Peru.

History

Copa Perú
The Club Deportivo Credicoop San Cristóbal was founded in 2017.

In 2017 Copa Perú, Credicoop San Cristóbal classified to the National Stage, but was eliminated by Las Palmas in the Second Round.

In 2018 Copa Perú, Credicoop San Cristóbal classified to the National Stage, but was eliminated by Pirata in the Quarterfinals.

In 2019 Copa Perú, Credicoop San Cristóbal classified to the National Stage, but was eliminated by Carlos Stein in the Quarterfinals.

In 2021 Copa Perú, Credicoop San Cristóbal classified to the National Stage, but was eliminated by Alfonso Ugarte in the Semifinals.

Honours

Regional
Liga Departamental de Moquegua:
Winners (4): 2017, 2018, 2019, 2022

Liga Provincial de Mariscal Nieto:
Winners (1): 2018
Runner-up (1): 2017

Liga Distrital de Samegua:
Winners (1): 2018
Runner-up (1): 2017

See also
List of football clubs in Peru
Peruvian football league system

References

External links
Official Facebook

Football clubs in Peru
Association football clubs established in 2017